Erick de Arruda Serafim (born 10 December 1997), simply known as Erick, is a Brazilian professional footballer who plays as a forward for Ceará.

Professional career
Erick made his professional debut with Náutico in a 0-0 Campeonato Brasileiro Série B tie with América Mineiro on 12 May 2017. On 29 August 2017, Erick signed with S.C. Braga for 4 seasons.

References

External links
 
 

1997 births
Living people
Sportspeople from Recife
Brazilian footballers
Brazilian expatriate footballers
Clube Náutico Capibaribe players
Ceará Sporting Club players
S.C. Braga B players
Esporte Clube Vitória players
Gil Vicente F.C. players
Primeira Liga players
Campeonato Brasileiro Série A players
Campeonato Brasileiro Série B players
Association football forwards
Brazilian expatriate sportspeople in Portugal
Expatriate footballers in Portugal